Svir is a Russian Navy hospital ship of the Ob-class. Svir is part of the Northern Fleet.

Development 
The four Ob-class hospital ships were designed to provide medical and recreational facilities. They were also employed as personnel transports. They have civilian crews but carry uniformed naval medical personnel. The ships are fully equipped with surgical equipment. Later two units are Project B-320 II, implying a modification to the basic design; the external differences are minor.

Construction and career
She was laid down in 1987 and launched in 1988 by Adolf Barsky shipyard. Commissioned in 1989 as a hospital ship.

Svir participated in long voyages to Cuba in 1990, Angola in 1992, and a serious fire occurred aboard Svir which resulted in 3 deaths and damages to the ship on 10 March 1999 as she was moored in Murmansk.

Svir took journalists to the wreak site of the sunken Kursk submarine between 24 to 29 September 2000. She provided medical support during the expedition to raise the sunken Kursk in 2001.

References 

Ships built in Russia
1988 ships
Hospital ships of the Soviet Union and Russia
Hospital ships
Auxiliary ships of the Russian Navy
Ob-class hospital ships